Nancy Sharon Kissinger (née Maginnes; born April 13, 1934) is an American philanthropist and socialite, and the  wife of former U.S. Secretary of State Henry Kissinger. The couple married on March 30, 1974, in Arlington, Virginia.

Life and career

Kissinger was born in Manhattan and raised in White Plains, New York. Her parents were Agnes (born McKinley) and Albert Bristol Maginnes, a wealthy lawyer and football player. She received a B.A. in history in 1955 from Mount Holyoke College.

Before her marriage, she was a long-time aide to New York Governor Nelson Rockefeller, recommended to him in 1964 by Kissinger, then a professor at Harvard, where she was a student. Her first job was as Kissinger's researcher on a Rockefeller task force; she continued working for Rockefeller at the Rockefeller Brothers Fund after the task force finished its work. She later became director of international studies for Rockefeller's Commission on Critical Choices for Americans.

References 

 "Nancy Maginnes Kissinger." Almanac of Famous People, 9th ed. Thomson Gale, 2007.  Reproduced in Biography Resource Center. Farmington Hills, Michigan: Gale, 2009. http://galenet.galegroup.com/servlet/BioRC.  Document Number: K1601047266. Fee, via Fairfax County Public Library.  Accessed 2009-11-17/

External links
 Interview on her visit with Bess W. Truman in 1975, in Independence, Missouri, with her husband
 Nancy and father Albert Bristol Maginnes

Mount Holyoke College alumni
Philanthropists from New York (state)
Harvard University alumni
Living people
1934 births
Henry Kissinger
People from Manhattan
People from White Plains, New York
The Masters School people